Town of Kent is a town in Putnam County, New York, United States.  The population was 12,900 at the 2020 census. The name is that of an early settler family. The town is in the north-central part of the Putnam County.  Many of the lakes are reservoirs for New York City.

History
Kent was part of the Philipse Patent of 1697, when it was still populated by the Wappinger tribe. Daniel Nimham (1724–1778) was the last chief of the Wappingers and was the most prominent Native American of his time in the Hudson Valley.

The town was first settled by Europeans in the mid-18th century by Zachariah Merritt and others, from New England, Westchester County, or the Fishkill area. Elisha Cole and his wife Hannah Smalley built Coles Mills in 1748, having moved to that location the previous year from Cape Cod.  Coles Mill operated until 1888 when it was submerged under West Branch Reservoir. Around this same time the northeastern part of the county was settled by the Kent, Townsend, and Ludington families, among others. The father of Hannah Smalley and his family moved to Kent about two years before Elisha Cole and his family.

Kent was a part of the Frederickstown Precinct which was chartered in 1772, the rest of Frederickstown consisting of the future town of Carmel and the western parts of the future towns of Patterson and Southeast.  Other early family names were Townsend, Smalley, Kent, Dykeman, Barrett, Cole, Boyd, Wixon, Farrington, Burton, Carter, and Ludington.

The present-day intersection of Interstate 84 and Ludingtonville Road was the home of Col. Henry Ludington and his daughter Sybil, who was said to have ridden  one night in 1777 to call up her father's militia during the American Revolutionary War.  A statue of her stands on the shores of Lake Gleneida across from the Putnam County Courthouse.

When the towns of Carmel and Patterson were split from Frederickstown in 1795, the remnant, constituting the current Kent, was established as the "Town of Frederick". Until 1812 it was part of Dutchess County.  The town's name was changed to "Kent" in 1817.  A small portion of the town of Philipstown was transferred to Kent in 1877.

The major population center of the township is Lake Carmel, a settlement around an artificial lake of the same name developed in the 1920s. Historically the population centers had been Farmer's Mills and Luddingtonville, little of which remain, and Cole's Mills, none of which remains.

Much of early Kent's economy was based on dairy farming for the New York City market, but with many reservoirs being constructed in the late 19th century for drinking water for the same city, most of the farms were submerged, and the dairy industry was all but abandoned by the 1920s. At that point, and because of the advent of the automobile, Kent started to attract new residents from the city.

The town is served by the Carmel Central School District and, for the majority of residents, by the Carmel Post Office. Kent is home to the  Nimham Mountain Fire Tower, located in the Taconic Hills. Built by the State of New York and the CCC in 1940, it is the tallest remaining fire tower in New York state and appears on the National Historic Lookout Register.  The Chuang Yen Monastery which is home to the largest indoor statue of Buddha in the Western Hemisphere is also located in Kent.

Geography

It borders the towns of Philipstown and Putnam Valley to the west and southwest; Patterson to the east, and Carmel to the south. The northern town line is the border of the Dutchess County towns of East Fishkill and Pawling. Two state parks, Wonder Lake in the east and Fahnestock in the west, a portion of the Appalachian National Scenic Trail, and thousands of acres of open space under the permanent protection of the New York City Department of Environmental Protection, offer recreational opportunities.

The town is home to a number of lakes which were once popular with summer residents but now have become year-round communities, including Sagamore Lake, Kentwood Lake, Lake Tibet, China Lake, Palmer Lake, and White Pond. Kent is also home to two reservoirs that are part of the New York City water supply system, with much adjacent land purchased by it for conservation through the Watershed Preservation Program. These include Boyds Corner and West Branch, with the latter being the east-of-Hudson terminus of the important Catskill/Delaware supply.

Interstate 84 and the Taconic State Parkway pass through the town.

Demographics

As of the census of 2000, there were 14,009 people, 4,868 households, and 3,748 families residing in the town.  The population density was 344.8 people per square mile (133.1/km2).  There were 5,353 housing units at an average density of 131.8 per square mile (50.9/km2).  The racial makeup of the town was 93.81% white, 1.41% African American, .14% Native American, 1.24% Asian, .01% Pacific Islander, 1.81% from other races, and 1.57% from two or more races. Hispanic or Latino of any race were 5.77% of the population.

There were 4,868 households, out of which 38.3% had children under the age of 18 living with them, 64.4% were married couples living together, 9.0% had a female householder with no husband present, and 23.0% were non-families. 17.5% of all households were made up of individuals, and 4.8% had someone living alone who was 65 years of age or older.  The average household size was 2.84 and the average family size was 3.24.

In the town, the population was spread out, with 26.3% under the age of 18, 6.2% from 18 to 24, 32.1% from 25 to 44, 25.7% from 45 to 64, and 9.7% who were 65 years of age or older.  The median age was 38 years. For every 100 females, there were 98.4 males.  For every 100 females age 18 and over, there were 96.2 males.

The median income for a household in the town was $72,346, and the median income for a family was $79,716. Males had a median income of $51,634 versus $38,575 for females. The per capita income for the town was $29,984.  About 4.2% of families and 4.1% of the population were below the poverty line, including 4.6% of those under age 18 and 8.4% of those age 65 or over.

Government

The town of Kent is governed by a town board which meets at a town hall in the hamlet of Kent Lakes. Laws are primarily enforced by officers of the town's police department.

Communities and locations in Kent

Allen Corners – hamlet in the northwestern part of the town
Berkshire Terrace – hamlet in the northern section of the town
Camp Hines – locale
Carmel Park Estates – locale
Clear Pool Camp – locale
Clarence Fahnestock State Park – state park in the western part of the town
Farmers Mills – a hamlet in the northwestern part of the town
Gipsy Trail Club – a locale
Hill & Dale Country Club – Palmer Lake Community
Lake Carmel – hamlet in the eastern part of the town
Kent Cliffs – a locale
Kent Corners – a hamlet north of Lake Carmel village
Kent Hills – a hamlet south of Ludingtonville
Kentwood Estates – hamlet in the northern part of town
Ludingtonville – hamlet near the northern town line
Meads Corners – a locale
Nimham Mountain Fire Tower – tallest historic fire tower in New York state 
Richardsville – a locale
Seven Hills Lake – a locale
Wonder Lake State Park – state park in the eastern section of the town
Yale Corners – a locale

Notable people
 Lewis Ludington, businessman, lumber baron, and real estate developer was born here.
The composers John Corigliano and Mark Adamo, a married couple, divide their time between their homes in Manhattan and Kent Cliffs.
George Whipple III, lawyer and society reporter for NY1, grew up here and ran for town supervisor in 1969, when he was 14.

References

External links
 Town of Kent official website
 Kent Public Library

Populated places established in the 18th century
Towns in Putnam County, New York